Kenneth Thome Bolaños (born 1 November 1968) is a Costa Rican former tennis player.

Born in San José, Thome is a grandson of Costa Rican international footballer Hernán Bolaños and younger brother of tennis player Fred Thome. He won a bronze medal partnering his brother in doubles at the 1987 Pan American Games.

Thome, who played tennis for Rice University, featured in 14 Davis Cup ties for Costa Rica during the 1990s. He won eight of his nine singles rubbers and had an 11–3 record in doubles.

A four-time medalist at the 1994 Central American Games, he returned as a 49-year old to compete in mixed doubles at the 2017 edition in Managua and with partner Andrea Brenes won a playoff for the bronze medal.

References

External links
 
 
 

1968 births
Living people
Costa Rican male tennis players
Tennis players at the 1987 Pan American Games
Pan American Games medalists in tennis
Pan American Games bronze medalists for Costa Rica
Central American Games gold medalists for Costa Rica
Central American Games bronze medalists for Costa Rica
Rice Owls men's tennis players
Medalists at the 1987 Pan American Games